Baltalı is a village in Tarsus  district of Mersin Province, Turkey. It is situated in Çukurova (Cilicia of the antiquity) plains to the south of Turkish state highway . The population of Baltalı was 449 as of 2012.

References

Villages in Tarsus District